Killing Mr. Griffin is a 1997 American television film directed by Jack Bender and starring Jay Thomas, Scott Bairstow, Mario Lopez, and Amy Jo Johnson. The film is based on Killing Mr. Griffin, a 1978 novel by Lois Duncan.

Synopsis
After being humiliated in English class by his teacher Mr. Griffin (Thomas), popular high-school student Mark Kinney (Bairstow) wants his revenge. With his friends, he plans to kidnap Mr. Griffin, using his girlfriend Susan (Amy Jo Johnson) as bait, to frighten Mr. Griffin and photograph him and expose him for the fatuous phony that he seems to be. The prank goes wrong, though, when Griffin dies from heart failure. Now, Mark and his friends must cover their tracks before they are accused of murder.

Cast
Scott Bairstow as Mark Kinney
Amy Jo Johnson as Susan McConnell
Chris Young as Jeff Garrett
Mario Lopez as Dave Ruggles
Michelle Williams as Maya
Jay Thomas as John Griffin
Maitland Ward as Candice Lee
Denise Dowse as Detective Pruitt
Joey Zimmerman as Nicholas McConnell
Paul Linke as Coach

External links
 
 

Films scored by Christophe Beck
Films directed by Jack Bender
1997 television films
1997 films
Films based on American novels
NBC network original films